The Grant Street Grocery and Market, at 815 S. Grant St. in Casper, Wyoming, was built in 1921.  It was listed on the National Register of Historic Places in 2008.

The store was under renovation in 2016 to re-open as a neighborhood grocery store, by five partners who were neighbors.

It was re-opened in 2017.

References

External links
Grant Street Grocery and Market, official site

National Register of Historic Places in Natrona County, Wyoming
Early Commercial architecture in the United States
Buildings and structures completed in 1921
Retail buildings in Wyoming
Grocery store buildings